Šovagović is a surname. Notable people with the surname include:

Anja Šovagović-Despot (born 1963), Croatian actress
Fabijan Šovagović, Croatian actor
Filip Šovagović (born 1966), Croatian actor, father of Anja and Fabijan

Croatian surnames